Lucrezia Gaia Millarini, born , is an English news journalist and television presenter, currently employed by ITN and presenting on ITV News.

Early life
Lucrezia Gaia Millarini was born in London on 18 February 1976 into a family of Italian descent.  She received her formative education at Dallington School, an independent school in London.  Before starting her career in journalism, Millarini studied law at Bristol University and went on to train as a barrister, and subsequently completed a postgraduate diploma in Broadcast Journalism from City University.  Initially working for a local radio station in Oxford, Millarini joined ITN's digital operation in London, reporting for the digital 24-hour rolling news channel.

Career
In December 2010, she joined ITV News London as their Entertainment Correspondent.  In January 2013, she was appointed a newsreader.  At present, Millarini now regularly presents the main 6:30pm news programme - ITV Evening News, as well as the ITV Lunchtime News (since 2017), ITV Weekend News (since 2015), the ITV Evening News (since 2019), and the ITV News at Ten (since 2021).  As well as fronting television news, Millarini has also reported for ITV's flagship current affairs programme, On Assignment.

Millarini reported on the births of two of the royal babies, and was reporting on the coverage of the wedding of Prince Harry and Meghan Markle.

She participated on Dancing on Ice on ITV in January 2020.  She won an episode of Celebrity Mastermind broadcast in December 2020.

On 9 April 2021, she broke the news of the death of Prince Philip, Duke of Edinburgh in a special announcement on ITV.  In December 2021, Millarini was one of the contestants on the BBC One quiz show The Weakest Link, with new host Romesh Ranganathan.

In May 2022, Millarini took part in the ITV hosted celebrity athletics show The Games, and in November 2022, appeared alongside her fellow ITN newsreader Nina Hossain in the BBC Two show Celebrity Antiques Road Trip.

Personal life
Millarini lives in south-east London with her husband, journalist Simon Kurs. Millarini is vegetarian and has a Lhasa Apso named Milo.

She is a patron of the animal welfare charities 'Dogs On The Streets' (DOTS) and 'Support Dogs'.  She also supports the Cats Protection League, The Humane Society and People for the Ethical Treatment of Animals.

References

External links

Linkedin page
Getty Images gallery

1976 births
Living people
English people of Italian descent
ITN newsreaders and journalists
Journalists from London
English women journalists
21st-century British journalists
British women television journalists
Alumni of the University of Bristol